The first cabinet of Kalevi Sorsa was the 56th government of Finland. The cabinet's Prime Minister was Kalevi Sorsa. The cabinet was in office from 4 September 1972 to 13 June 1975.

President Urho Kekkonen dissolved the government and the Parliament on 13 June 1975 and called a new parliamentary election during the same year.

The Sorsa Cabinet started its term during a time of economic growth for Finland. This allowed the government to make social reforms to pension and public health. The Sorsa government made plans for investments to industry, including those relating to the Loviisa Nuclear Power Plant. Due to the financial issues caused by the 1973 Middle East Oil Crisis, these plans were delayed. The government also had to control foreign capital exchange.

Ministers 

|}

References 

Sorsa
1972 establishments in Finland
1975 disestablishments in Finland
Cabinets established in 1972
Cabinets disestablished in 1975